Amalia Guglielminetti (4 April 1881 – 4 December 1941) was an Italian poet and writer.

Life
Amalia, who had two sisters, Emma and Erminia, and a brother, Ernesto, was born in Turin to Pietro Guglielminetti and his wife Felicita Lavezzato.  Her great-grandfather had moved from Cravanzana to Turin around 1858, where he had established a timber business. He invented a water canteen, at that time made of wood, which became popular. Her father died in 1886, and the family moved in with a grandfather, who sent Amalia to a religious school.

She started writing in 1901 for the Gazzetta del Popolo where her poetry was published in the Sunday supplement. Her poetry then appeared in Voci di Giovinezza, published in 1903, and was dedicated to her father.

Her main works are the poetry collections Le seduzioni (1908) and L'insonne (1913) and the prose collections I volti dell'amore (1913) and Quando avevo un amante (1923).

She had an affair with Guido Gozzano with whom she exchanged a series of love letters in 1907-09, published posthumously.

Between 1916 and 1925 she wrote books for children: Fiabe in versi (1916); La reginetta Chiomadoro (1923); Il ragno incantato (1923) and La carriera dei pupazzi (1925). In addition, she contributed to Lidel, a nationalist women's magazine which was in circulation in the period 1919–1935.

In the following years she became romantically involved with Pitigrilli (Dino Segre). The relationship became so intense that she had a nervous breakdown. She eventually recovered, and felt that the experience had made her stronger.

In 1935 Guglielminetti moved to Rome to pursue a career in journalism, but returned to Turin in 1937. She died from complications resulting from an accident during an air-raid. She had always been a solitary and somewhat depressed figure.

Bibliography
 Benso, Ornella: Una relazione letteraria. Amalia Guglielminetti e Guido Gozzano, Turín, 1944.
 Gastaldi, M.: Amalia Guglielminetti, Milán, 1930.
 Guglielminetti, Marziano: La Musa subalpina. Amalia e Guido, Pastonchi e Pitigrilli, Florencia, L. S. Olschki, 2007.
 Ferraro, Alessandro: La corsa del levriero. Amalia Guglielminetti nel Novecento italiano, in Amalia Guglielminetti, La rivincita del maschio, edit by Alessandro Ferraro, Genova, Sagep, 2014.
 Ferraro, Alessandro: Il frutto dietro la foglia. 1928 e 1934: Amalia Guglielminetti denunciata due volte per oltraggio al pudore, «Nuova Corrente», LXII, 155, 2015.
 Ferraro, Alessandro: Amalia Guglielminetti. Le opere, la vita (1881-1941), Genova, 2016.
 Rota, Marina: Amalia, se Voi foste uomo..., Torino, Golem, 2016

References

External links
 

1881 births
1941 deaths
Italian women poets
Writers from Turin
20th-century Italian poets
20th-century Italian women writers
Italian civilians killed in World War II
Deaths by airstrike during World War II
Accidental deaths in Italy